"Nexus 4/Shine" is the thirty-sixth single by L'Arc-en-Ciel, released on August 27, 2008. The double A-side single features the song "Nexus 4" which was used in a commercial for the Subaru Legacy and the song "Shine" which was used as the opening song for the NHK anime series Guardian of the Spirit.  "Nexus 4/Shine" reached number 2 on the Oricon Singles Chart and sold 109,752 in the first week.

Track listing

References

2008 singles
L'Arc-en-Ciel songs
Songs written by Hyde (musician)
Songs written by Tetsuya (musician)
Anime songs
Ki/oon Music singles